West Baktiya is a district in North Aceh Regency, Nanggröe Aceh Darussalam, province of Indonesia.

West Baktiya has several villages, namely:
 Blang Rheue
 Blang Seunong
 Cot Kupok
 Cot Laba
 Cot Murong
 Cot Paya
 Cot Usen
 Lang Nibong
 Lhok Euncien
 Lhok Iboh
 Matang Bayu
 Matang Ceubreuk
 Matang Panyang
 Matang Paya
 Matang Raya Blang Sialet
 West Matang Sijuek
 Central Matang Sijuek
 East Matang Sijuek
 Matang Teungoh
 Meunasah Cot Kupok
 Meunasah Hagu
 Meunasah Pante
 Meurandeh Paya
 Paya Bateung
 Pucok Alue Buket
 Singgah Mata
 Keude Sampoiniet

North Aceh Regency
Districts of Aceh